is a junction railway station located in the city of Sakaide, Kagawa Prefecture, Japan. It is operated by JR Shikoku and has the station number "Y08".

Lines
Sakaide Station is served by the JR Shikoku Yosan Line and is located 21.3 km from the beginning of the line at Takamatsu. Limited express trains other than 'Uzushio' that arrive at and depart from Okayama, local trains, rapid trains, and sleeper limited express trains stop here. Since all four limited express trains of ``Uzushio run two round trips, the only limited express trains from Sakaide Station to Okayama Station are sleeper limited express trains. Limited express trains such as "Ishizuchi" bound for Matsuyama Station, "Shimanto" bound for Kochi Station, event trains, limited express trains that run early in the morning, etc. only stop in the Ehime/Kochi direction.

Layout
The station consists of an elevated side platform and an elevated island Platform serving three tracks with the station building underneath. The station has a Midori no Madoguchi'' staffed ticket office.

Adjacent stations

|-
!colspan=5|JR Shikoku

History
Sakaide Station opened on 21 February 1897 as a station on the Sanuki Railway when the section between Takamatsu and Marugame opened. In 1904 the line became part of the Sanyo Railway, which was nationalized in 1906. With the privatization of Japanese National Railways (JNR) on 1 April 1987, control of the station passed to JR Shikoku.

Surrounding area
Sakaide City Hall
Sakaide Station North Exit Underground Parking Lot
Kagawa Prefectural Sakaide High School
Sakaide Daiichi High School

See also
 List of railway stations in Japan

References

External links

Official home page

Railway stations in Kagawa Prefecture
Railway stations in Japan opened in 1897
Sakaide, Kagawa